Audoleon (Greek: Αὐδολέων or Αὐδωλέων; gen.: Αὐδολέοντος/Αὐδωλέωντος; 315–285 BC) was an ancient Paeonian king son of Patraus, Agis or Ariston, the general of Alexander the Great. He was the father of Ariston, and of a daughter who married Pyrrhus of Epirus. In a war with the Illyrian tribe Autariatae he was reduced to great straits, but was succoured by Cassander.

References

Bibliography 
Heckel, W. (2006) Who's Who in the Age of Alexander the Great: Prosopography of Alexander's Empire, Blackwell, Oxford.

Paeonian kings
Paeonia (kingdom)
4th-century BC rulers
3rd-century BC rulers
Pyrrhus of Epirus
Antipatrid Macedonia